Kingdom commonly refers to:

 A monarchy ruled by a king or queen

 Kingdom (biology), a category in biological taxonomy

Kingdom may also refer to:

Arts and media

Television
 Kingdom (British TV series), a 2007 British television drama starring Stephen Fry
 Kingdom (American TV series), a 2014 US television drama starring Frank Grillo
 Kingdom (South Korean TV series), a 2019 South Korean television series
Kingdom: Legendary War, a 2021 South Korean television series

Music
 Kingdom (group), a South Korean boy group
 Kingdom (Koda Kumi album), 2008
 Kingdom (Bilal Hassani album), 2019
 Kingdom (Covenant Worship album), 2014
 Kingdoms (Life in Your Way album), 2011
 Kingdoms (Broadway album), 2009
 Kingdom (EP), a 1998 EP by Vader
 "Kingdom" (Dave Gahan song), 2007
 "Kingdom" (Maverick City Music and Kirk Franklin song), 2022
 "Kingdom", a song by Battle Beast on their 2013 album Battle Beast
 "Kingdom", a song by Susumu Hirasawa on his 1995 album Sim City
 "Kingdom", a song by Soulfly on their 2010 album Omen
 "Kingdom", a song by Devin Townsend Project on their 2012 album Epicloud
 "Kingdom", a song by Wolf & Cub on their 2006 album Vessels

Other media
 Kingdoms (board game), a board game by Reiner Knizia
 Kingdom (comics), a comic series by Dan Abnett and Richard Elson published in the weekly 2000 AD
 Kingdom (magazine), an American quarterly
 Kingdom (manga), a 2006 Japanese manga
Kingdom (film), 2019 live action film based on the above
 Kingdom (video game), a 2015 video game

People
 Park Yong-Wook, also known as "Kingdom", a professional Korean StarCraft player
 Isambard Kingdom Brunel (1806–1859), English engineer
 Johnny Kingdom (1939–2018), English wildlife filmmaker
 Roger Kingdom, American hurdler

Other
 Kingdom Holding Company, a Saudi investment company

See also 
 The Kingdom (disambiguation)
 Kingdom of God